This is a list of solar eclipses in the 20th century. During the period 1901 to 2000 there were 228 solar eclipses of which 78 were partial, 73 were annular (two non-central), 71 were total (three non-central) and 6 were hybrids. The greatest number of eclipses in one year was five, in 1935, and one month, July 2000, had two eclipses.

Notable eclipses of the 20th century
 29 May 1919: this total eclipse was photographed by Arthur Eddington to verify general relativity (see Eddington experiment)
 20 June 1955: longest total eclipse between 1901 and 2000, lasting a maximum of 7 minutes and 8 seconds
 30 June 1973: a Concorde jet flew along the path, thereby extending the length of totality to 74 min.
 29 March 1987: second hybrid eclipse in less than one year, the first being on 3 October 1986.
 11 July 1991: Solar eclipse with the shortest gamma, of only −0.00412.
 31 July 2000: the second solar eclipse within one calendar month, the first being on 1 July 2000.

Table 

The table gives the date and time of the greatest eclipse (in dynamical time, which in this case is the time when the axis of the Moon's shadow cone passes closest to the centre of Earth). It also gives the type of eclipse (either Total, Annular, Partial or Hybrid) and for total and annular eclipses it gives the duration of the eclipse. The location of the greatest eclipse and the path width are also given, as well as the geographical areas affected.

References

20th century-related lists
+20